Roman Pyatkovka (Роман Пятковка) is a leading exponent of Ukrainian conceptual photography most strongly associated with  the  Kharkiv School of Fine Art Photography. Pyatkovka pioneered a style of photography which challenged the prevailing ethos of Socialist Realism, the style which had dominated Soviet photography and filmmaking since the early 1930s. In contrast to Socialist Realism which portrayed scenes of a harmonious communist society, photographers of the Kharkiv School challenged the prevailing status quo with a socially challenging contemporary aesthetic. Pyatkovka’s use of overlays and hand-colouring helped define this new style, one which would continue to push artistic boundaries both during and after the more artistically varied Perestroyka years. In 1989 he joined the National Society of Photo Artists of Ukraine (NSPAU).

Pyatkovka has exhibited worldwide including at the Multimedia Art Museum (Moscow, Russia), the National Centre for Contemporary Arts (NCCA) (Moscow, Russia), Museum of Ken Damy (Bresha, Italy), Museum of Contemporary Photography (Chicago, United States), Moscow Museum of Modern Art (Moscow, Russia), The Navigator Foundation (Boston, USA), and ARTOTHEK (Nürnberg, Germany).

Recent works 

One of Pyatkovka's more noted exhibitions presents a small selection of works from his big series "Soviet Photo" (2012). These vivid images consist of pictures and pages from "Советское фото" (Soviet Photo) magazine, the only photography publication available in the Soviet Union from 1926 to 1992. Much like most publications at the time, the magazine was state-run and loaded with Communist images. Pyatkovka, at the time an underground photographer, juxtaposed these state-approved images with his works, risking imprisonment. Pyatkovka’s aim is for the viewer to reconsider and reflect upon this period of Russian history through these contrasting images. It was this project that won him the Conceptual Photographer of the Year award at the 2013 Sony World Photography Awards.

Publications 
 Post-Photography: The Artist with a Camera by Robert Shore.  Laurence King, London
 Eyemazing: The New Collectible Art Photography . Thames & Hudson, London
 Sony World Photography Awards 2013. . London
 NUDE ART TODAY TOME III 2013. . Paris
 SCHEME – Zine collection N°5. . Paris
 "Le Portrait Dans L'Art Contemporain – 2011"  Paris
 "ХАРЬКОВ. Хроника Pеволюции" (eng.-"Kharkov. Chronicle of the Revolution") (2005) 
 Hannu Eerikainenen. Naneli Esckola "Toisin Nakijat" 
 "Un Nouveau Pausage Humain" Recontres Internationales de la Photographie. 
 Daniela Mrazkova "What is Photography" 
 Юрий Рыбчинский "Фото эстафета. От Родченко до наших дней"

See also 
Kharkiv School of Photography

References 

Ukrainian photographers